The 1928 NC State Wolfpack football team was an American football team that represented North Carolina State University as a member of the Southern Conference (SoCon) during the 1928 college football season. In its fifth and final season under head coach Gus Tebell, the team compiled a 4–5–1 record (1–4–1 against SoCon opponents), finished in 17th place in the conference, and outscored opponents by a total of 157 to 100.

Schedule

References

NC State
NC State Wolfpack football seasons
NC State Wolfpack football